Juan Manuel Moreno Bonilla (born 1 May 1970) is a Spanish politician and president of the Andalusian branch of the People's Party. Since 18 January 2019, he has been the President of the Government of Andalusia. He represented the Cantabria constituency in the Spanish Congress of Deputies from 2000 to 2004 and the Málaga constituency from 2007 to 2011. He has also been a member of the Senate of Spain and Parliament of Andalusia.

Early life and education
Born in Barcelona (Catalonia) in 1970 as the second child of two Andalusian immigrants (Juan Moreno & María Bonilla) originating from the Malaga province town of Alhaurín el Grande in the Province of Málaga, Juan Manuel Moreno was only three months old when his family returned to their homeland, where he spent his childhood. Moreno acquired his bachelor's degree in Protocol and Institutional Relations at Camilo José Cela University (UCJC).

Political career
Moreno started his career in the realm of politics when he ran, as a 24-year-old, in the Malaga municipal elections in the list of the Partido Popular (People's Party), the main conservative party in Spain, being elected city councillor. He also held the position of President of the New Generations of the party and coordinated the party's regional politics alongside Javier Arenas, who, as Moreno would from 2014 onwards, held the presidency of the party's Andalusian branch between 1993 and 1999.

Councillor, Malaga City Council (1995–1997) 
In 1995, at the age of 25, he was elected Councillor for Youth and Sport in the Malaga Town Hall, with Celia Villalobos as Mayor, as well as President of the Municipal Board of the district of Campanillas and Puerto de la Torre. A year later, he was already President of Nuevas Generaciones de Andalucía.

Regional deputy in the Parliament of Andalusia (1997–2000) 
In 1997, at the age of 27, he was elected Member of Parliament for Malaga and spokesman for the Popular Parliamentary Group's Youth during the V Legislature of the Parliament of Andalusia. He was also elected president of New Generations at the national level and responsible for the party's Autonomous and Local Policy.

National Representative in Congress (2000–2011) 
He was a national deputy in the Congress during the VII (for Cantabria), VIII, IX and X legislatures, acting as deputy spokesman of the Popular Group in the Science and Technology Commission and as secretary in the Social Affairs Commission.

He obtained a degree in Protocol and Organization of Events from the Camilo José Cela University, as well as several of his own degrees (Higher University Degree in Protocol and Institutional Relations from the Camilo José Cela University, Master's Degree in Business Management and Administration from the Escuela Autónoma de Dirección de Empresas and the Leadership Program for Public Management from IESE Business School) and a prize (Golden master's degree from the Royal Forum for Senior Management).

In September 2006, he married Granada-based political scientist Manuela Villena.

In the 2018 Andalusian elections, the People's Party list led by Moreno obtained a representation of 26 seats in the parliament, finishing second behind the Spanish Socialist Party (PSOE), which had been the only party in the government of Andalusia since Spain became a democracy, obtaining 33 seats. Despite the PP scoring one of its worst historical results in the region, it was able to reach a government agreement with the liberal Ciudadanos (Cs), which had obtained 21 seats, and secured the support of Vox, the young far-right party that obtained 12 seats. This way, Moreno was elected president with the support of 59 of the 109 members in the Parliament of Andalusia. He thus became the first conservative president of Andalusia in Spain's four-decade-long democracy. 

Due to the rejection by Vox of the 2022 budget, Moreno called for snap elections. In the 2022 regional elections, PP got an absolute majority with 58 seats, stopping Vox and defeating PSOE in its former stronghold.

References 

1970 births
Living people
People's Party (Spain) politicians
Members of the 7th Congress of Deputies (Spain)
Members of the 8th Congress of Deputies (Spain)
Members of the 9th Congress of Deputies (Spain)
Members of the 10th Congress of Deputies (Spain)
People from Barcelona
Members of the Senate of Spain
Municipal councillors in the province of Málaga
Members of the 5th Parliament of Andalusia
Members of the 10th Parliament of Andalusia
Members of the 11th Parliament of Andalusia
Presidents of the Regional Government of Andalusia